Adlappa is a monotypic genus of grasshoppers belonging to the family Acrididae. The only species is Adlappa erythroptera.

The species is found in Australia.

References

Acrididae
Monotypic Orthoptera genera